The 2005 Danmark Rundt was ridden from 3 August to 7 August 2005. This edition is remembered for the complete dominance of Ivan Basso, who won 4 of the 6 stages, and the overall classification. It was the 15th edition of the men's stage race, which was established in 1985.

Stages
The total length of the race was 848.8 km.

Stage 1: Skive – Skive (210 km)

Stage 2: Viborg – Århus (185 km)

Stage 3: Århus – Vejle (185 km)

Stage 4: Assens – Odense (90 km)

Stage 5: Nyborg (13.8 km, ITT)

Stage 6: Slagelse – Frederiksberg (165 km)

Final classifications

Overall classement (yellow jersey)

Ivan Basso's average speed for the race was 42.489 km/h.

Point classement (purple jersey)

Hill classement (red-dotted jersey)

Youth classement (white jersey)

Team classement

Fighter classement

References
cyclingnews

 

2005
Danmark Rundt
Danmark Rundt, 2005
August 2005 sports events in Europe